Seltso is the name of several inhabited localities in Russia.

Modern localities

Arkhangelsk Oblast
As of 2014, one rural locality in Arkhangelsk Oblast bears this name:

Seltso, Arkhangelsk Oblast, a village in Zaostrovsky Selsoviet of Vinogradovsky District;

Bryansk Oblast
As of 2014, five inhabited localities in Bryansk Oblast bear this name:

Urban localities
Seltso, a town under the administrative jurisdiction of Seltsovsky Urban Administrative Okrug (city of oblast significance); 

Rural localities
Seltso, Bryansky District, Bryansk Oblast, a village in Glinishchevsky Rural Administrative Okrug of Bryansky District; 
Seltso, Dyatkovsky District, Bryansk Oblast, a village under the administrative jurisdiction of Ivotsky Settlement Administrative Okrug in Dyatkovsky District; 
Seltso, Kletnyansky District, Bryansk Oblast, a village in Nadvinsky Rural Administrative Okrug of Kletnyansky District; 
Seltso, Rognedinsky District, Bryansk Oblast, a village in Fedorovsky Rural Administrative Okrug of Rognedinsky District;

Ivanovo Oblast
As of 2014, three rural localities in Ivanovo Oblast bear this name:

Seltso, Savinsky District, Ivanovo Oblast, a village in Savinsky District; 
Seltso, Vichugsky District, Ivanovo Oblast, a village in Vichugsky District; 
Seltso, Yuryevetsky District, Ivanovo Oblast, a village in Yuryevetsky District;

Kaluga Oblast
As of 2014, two rural localities in Kaluga Oblast bear this name:
Seltso, Baryatinsky District, Kaluga Oblast, a village in Baryatinsky District
Seltso, Mosalsky District, Kaluga Oblast, a village in Mosalsky District

Kostroma Oblast
As of 2014, two rural localities in Kostroma Oblast bear this name:

Seltso, Kostromskoy District, Kostroma Oblast, a village in Samsonovskoye Settlement of Kostromskoy District; 
Seltso, Sudislavsky District, Kostroma Oblast, a village in Voronskoye Settlement of Sudislavsky District;

Leningrad Oblast
As of 2014, four rural localities in Leningrad Oblast bear this name:

Seltso, Tikhvinsky District, Leningrad Oblast, a village in Shugozerskoye Settlement Municipal Formation of Tikhvinsky District; 
Seltso, Tosnensky District, Leningrad Oblast, a settlement under the administrative jurisdiction of Lyubanskoye Settlement Municipal Formation in Tosnensky District; 
Seltso (settlement), Seltsovskoye Settlement Municipal Formation, Volosovsky District, Leningrad Oblast, a settlement in Seltsovskoye Settlement Municipal Formation of Volosovsky District; 
Seltso (village), Seltsovskoye Settlement Municipal Formation, Volosovsky District, Leningrad Oblast, a village in Seltsovskoye Settlement Municipal Formation of Volosovsky District;

Moscow Oblast
As of 2014, two rural localities in Moscow Oblast bear this name:

Seltso, Konstantinovskoye Rural Settlement, Ramensky District, Moscow Oblast, a village in Konstantinovskoye Rural Settlement of Ramensky District; 
Seltso, Ostrovetskoye Rural Settlement, Ramensky District, Moscow Oblast, a village in Ostrovetskoye Rural Settlement of Ramensky District;

Nizhny Novgorod Oblast
As of 2014, one rural locality in Nizhny Novgorod Oblast bears this name:

Seltso, Nizhny Novgorod Oblast, a village in Nikolo-Pogostinsky Selsoviet of Gorodetsky District;

Novgorod Oblast
As of 2014, nine rural localities in Novgorod Oblast bear this name:
Seltso, Batetsky District, Novgorod Oblast, a village in Batetskoye Settlement of Batetsky District
Seltso, Kholmsky District, Novgorod Oblast, a village in Togodskoye Settlement of Kholmsky District
Seltso, Moshenskoy District, Novgorod Oblast, a village in Kirovskoye Settlement of Moshenskoy District
Seltso, Novgorodsky District, Novgorod Oblast, a village in Borkovskoye Settlement of Novgorodsky District
Seltso, Fedorkovskoye Settlement, Parfinsky District, Novgorod Oblast, a village in Fedorkovskoye Settlement of Parfinsky District
Seltso, Polavskoye Settlement, Parfinsky District, Novgorod Oblast, a village in Polavskoye Settlement of Parfinsky District
Seltso, Soletsky District, Novgorod Oblast, a village in Dubrovskoye Settlement of Soletsky District
Seltso, Gorskoye Settlement, Volotovsky District, Novgorod Oblast, a village in Gorskoye Settlement of Volotovsky District
Seltso, Slavitinskoye Settlement, Volotovsky District, Novgorod Oblast, a village in Slavitinskoye Settlement of Volotovsky District

Pskov Oblast
As of 2014, three rural localities in Pskov Oblast bear this name:
Seltso, Dedovichsky District, Pskov Oblast, a village in Dedovichsky District
Seltso, Loknyansky District, Pskov Oblast, a village in Loknyansky District
Seltso, Pskovsky District, Pskov Oblast, a village in Pskovsky District

Smolensk Oblast
As of 2014, twelve rural localities in Smolensk Oblast bear this name:
Seltso, Demidovsky District, Smolensk Oblast, a village in Zhichitskoye Rural Settlement of Demidovsky District
Seltso, Dukhovshchinsky District, Smolensk Oblast, a village in Prechistenskoye Rural Settlement of Dukhovshchinsky District
Seltso, Gagarinsky District, Smolensk Oblast, a village in Nikolskoye Rural Settlement of Gagarinsky District
Seltso, Kholm-Zhirkovsky District, Smolensk Oblast, a village under the administrative jurisdiction of Kholm-Zhirkovskoye Urban Settlement in Kholm-Zhirkovsky District
Seltso, Novoduginsky District, Smolensk Oblast, a village in Dneprovskoye Rural Settlement of Novoduginsky District
Seltso, Pochinkovsky District, Smolensk Oblast, a village in Leninskoye Rural Settlement of Pochinkovsky District
Seltso, Rudnyansky District, Smolensk Oblast, a village in Klyarinovskoye Rural Settlement of Rudnyansky District
Seltso, Safonovsky District, Smolensk Oblast, a village in Baranovskoye Rural Settlement of Safonovsky District
Seltso, Tyomkinsky District, Smolensk Oblast, a village in Kikinskoye Rural Settlement of Tyomkinsky District
Seltso, Ugransky District, Smolensk Oblast, a village in Rusanovskoye Rural Settlement of Ugransky District
Seltso, Vyazemsky District, Smolensk Oblast, a village in Polyanovskoye Rural Settlement of Vyazemsky District
Seltso, Yartsevsky District, Smolensk Oblast, a village in Podroshchinskoye Rural Settlement of Yartsevsky District

Tver Oblast
As of 2014, six rural localities in Tver Oblast bear this name:
Seltso, Bezhetsky District, Tver Oblast, a village in Filippkovskoye Rural Settlement of Bezhetsky District
Seltso, Kalininsky District, Tver Oblast, a village in Krasnogorskoye Rural Settlement of Kalininsky District
Seltso, Rameshkovsky District, Tver Oblast, a village in Ilgoshchi Rural Settlement of Rameshkovsky District
Seltso, Staritsky District, Tver Oblast, a village in Novo-Yamskoye Rural Settlement of Staritsky District
Seltso, Maryinskoye Rural Settlement, Torzhoksky District, Tver Oblast, a village in Maryinskoye Rural Settlement of Torzhoksky District
Seltso, Ostashkovskoye Rural Settlement, Torzhoksky District, Tver Oblast, a village in Ostashkovskoye Rural Settlement of Torzhoksky District

Vladimir Oblast
As of 2014, four rural localities in Vladimir Oblast bear this name:
Seltso, Gorokhovetsky District, Vladimir Oblast, a village in Gorokhovetsky District
Seltso, Kovrovsky District, Vladimir Oblast, a village in Kovrovsky District
Seltso, Muromsky District, Vladimir Oblast, a village in Muromsky District
Seltso, Suzdalsky District, Vladimir Oblast, a selo in Suzdalsky District

Vologda Oblast
As of 2014, five rural localities in Vologda Oblast bear this name:
Seltso, Shchetinsky Selsoviet, Cherepovetsky District, Vologda Oblast, a village in Shchetinsky Selsoviet of Cherepovetsky District
Seltso, Telepshinsky Selsoviet, Cherepovetsky District, Vologda Oblast, a village in Telepshinsky Selsoviet of Cherepovetsky District
Seltso, Sheksninsky District, Vologda Oblast, a village in Domshinsky Selsoviet of Sheksninsky District
Seltso, Sokolsky District, Vologda Oblast, a village in Prigorodny Selsoviet of Sokolsky District
Seltso, Ustyuzhensky District, Vologda Oblast, a village in Podolsky Selsoviet of Ustyuzhensky District

Yaroslavl Oblast
As of 2014, nine rural localities in Yaroslavl Oblast bear this name:
Seltso, Bolsheselsky District, Yaroslavl Oblast, a village in Bolsheselsky Rural Okrug of Bolsheselsky District
Seltso, Lyubimsky District, Yaroslavl Oblast, a village in Voskresensky Rural Okrug of Lyubimsky District
Seltso, Rostovsky District, Yaroslavl Oblast, a selo in Sulostsky Rural Okrug of Rostovsky District
Seltso, Lomovsky Rural Okrug, Rybinsky District, Yaroslavl Oblast, a village in Lomovsky Rural Okrug of Rybinsky District
Seltso, Nazarovsky Rural Okrug, Rybinsky District, Yaroslavl Oblast, a village in Nazarovsky Rural Okrug of Rybinsky District
Seltso, Nikolo-Edomsky Rural Okrug, Tutayevsky District, Yaroslavl Oblast, a village in Nikolo-Edomsky Rural Okrug of Tutayevsky District
Seltso, Pomogalovsky Rural Okrug, Tutayevsky District, Yaroslavl Oblast, a village in Pomogalovsky Rural Okrug of Tutayevsky District
Seltso, Uglichsky District, Yaroslavl Oblast, a village in Maymersky Rural Okrug of Uglichsky District
Seltso, Yaroslavsky District, Yaroslavl Oblast, a village in Tochishchensky Rural Okrug of Yaroslavsky District

Alternative names
Seltso, alternative name of Pogost, a village in Seletsky Selsoviet of Kholmogorsky District in Arkhangelsk Oblast; 
Seltso, alternative name of Seltso-Rudnoye, a village in Ovstugsky Rural Administrative Okrug of Zhukovsky District in Bryansk Oblast;